Vanessa Camila Hoppe Espoz (born 1981) is a Chilean lawyer who was elected as a member of the Chilean Constitutional Convention.

References

External links
 

Living people
Chilean women lawyers
21st-century Chilean politicians
Communist Party of Chile politicians
ARCIS University alumni
Members of the Chilean Constitutional Convention
21st-century Chilean women politicians
1980 births
21st-century Chilean lawyers